Pegasus 3 or III, also known as Pegasus C before launch, was an American satellite which was launched in 1965 to study micrometeoroid impacts in Low Earth orbit. It was the last of three Pegasus satellites to be launched, the previous two having been launched earlier the same year. It was manufactured by Fairchild Hiller, and operated by NASA.

Spacecraft

Launch
Pegasus 3 was launched atop a Saturn I rocket, serial number SA-10, flying from Launch Complex 37B at the Cape Kennedy Air Force Station. The launch occurred at 13:00:00 UTC on 30 July 1965. Following launch, Pegasus 3 was given the COSPAR designation 1965-060A, whilst NORAD assigned it the Satellite Catalog Number 01467.

Pegasus 3 was a secondary payload on the carrier rocket, which was carrying a boilerplate Apollo spacecraft, Apollo 105 or BP-9A, as part of a series of configuration tests for the Apollo program. The Apollo boilerplate acted as a payload fairing for the Pegasus spacecraft, which was stored inside what would have been the Service Module of a functional spacecraft. Upon reaching orbit, the boilerplate Command and Service modules were jettisoned.

Operations
Pegasus 3 was operated in a low Earth orbit. Once in orbit, the panels were deployed to detect micrometeoroid impacts. Experiment results were returned to Earth by radio. The spacecraft operated until 29 August 1968, and subsequently remained in orbit until it decayed and reentered the atmosphere on 4 August 1969. It had originally only been expected to operate for 720 days.

See also

1965 in spaceflight

References

Spacecraft launched in 1965
Spacecraft launched by Saturn rockets